Łąki (meaning "meadows") may refer to:
Łąki, Lower Silesian Voivodeship (south-west Poland)
Łąki, West Pomeranian Voivodeship (north-west Poland)
Łąki, Lublin Voivodeship (east Poland)
Łąki, Garwolin County in Masovian Voivodeship (east-central Poland)
Łąki, Warsaw West County in Masovian Voivodeship (east-central Poland)
Łąki, Wołomin County in Masovian Voivodeship (east-central Poland)

See also
 Laki (disambiguation)
 Louky nad Olší (Łąki nad Olzą), a village in the Czech Republic